Shahr-e Jadid-e Parand (also Romanized as Shahr-e Jadīd-e Parand) is a village in Manjilabad Rural District, in the Central District of Robat Karim County, Tehran Province, Iran. At the 2006 census, its population was 5,791, in 1,603 families.

References 

Populated places in Robat Karim County